Monte Carlo Fashions Limited, doing business as Monte Carlo, is an Indian retail clothing chain. It specialises in fast fashion, and sells clothing, accessories, shoes.

Background 

Monte Carlo Fashions limited is selling its apparel products under the brand name of Monte Carlo which was established in 1984 by Oswal Woollen Mills Limited and is owned by parent company Nahar Group based in Ludhiana, Punjab. Mr. Jawahar Lal Oswal is the chairman and managing director of the company.

Manufacturer Unit 

The company has two manufacturing units in Jalandhar. There are over 1,450 employees.

Retail 

In the year 2006, they had 23 stores. In 2009, the 100th store was opened in New Delhi. As of March 2014, there were 191 ‘Monte Carlo has 200 Exclusive Brand Outlets’ in India and two are in Dubai & Kathmandu respectively and over 1,300 multi brand outlets across India. Monte Carlo has been awarded the Superbrand status.

Stock Market Launch 

In December 2014, Monte Carlo Fashion Limited launched IPO with price band of  ₹630 to ₹645 per share.

Website

References

Clothing brands of India
Clothing companies of India